Grabovo is a village in Serbia. It is situated in the Beočin municipality, in the Vojvodina province. Although, the village is geographically located in Syrmia, it is part of the South Bačka District. The village has a Serb ethnic majority. The population of the village, numbering 138 people according to a 2002 census, is steadily declining and the village is in danger of disappearing.

Location
The village is located on the northern part of Fruška Gora mountain.

Grabovo is one of the most isolated villages in Beočin municipality, and also in the region. Bus No.84 connects the villages of Grabovo and Sviloš to Lug, Beočin and Novi Sad; it operates only on work days: three times a day to Grabovo (from Novi Sad via Beočin), and once a day from Grabovo.

History

During the Axis occupation in World War II, 151 civilians were killed in Grabovo by fascists.

Historical population

1961: 219
1971: 174
1981: 162
1991: 142
2002: 138

Features

Village has one Serbian Orthodox Church, which is in ruins. It also has a small ambulance, a small tavern, and a grocery store.

References
Miloš Lukić, Putevima slobode - naselja opštine Beočin u ratu i revoluciji, Novi Sad, 1987.
Slobodan Ćurčić, Broj stanovnika Vojvodine, Novi Sad, 1996.

See also
List of places in Serbia
List of cities, towns and villages in Vojvodina

Populated places in Syrmia
Beočin